Events from the year 1681 in France

Incumbents
 Monarch – Louis XIV

Events
15 May – The Canal du Midi is opened officially, as the Canal Royal de Languedoc.
30 September – France annexes the city of Strasbourg, previously a free imperial city of the Holy Roman Empire.
The Dragonnades are instituted to intimidate Huguenot families into either leaving France or converting to Catholicism. Collections are made in England for needy French refugees.
 The Port of Honfleur is remodelled by Abraham Duquesne.

Births

9 April – Nicolas Edelinck, engraver (d. 1767)
11 April – Anne Danican Philidor, musician (d. 1728)
26 May – Antoine-François Botot Dangeville, dancing master, dancer and ballet teacher (d. c.1737)
31 May – Joseph-François Lafitau, Jesuit missionary, ethnologist, and naturalist (d. 1746)
6 October – Charles François de Mondion, architect and military engineer (d. 1733)
19 October – Claude Bouhier de Lantenay, clergyman and the second bishop of Dijon (d. 1755)
7 November – Isaac-Joseph Berruyer, Jesuit historian (d. 1748)

Full date missing
Antoine Sartine, French-born financier and Spanish administrator (d. 1744)

Deaths

16 January – Olivier Patru, lawyer and writer (b. 1604)
24 January – Jean Baptiste Gonet, Dominican theologian (b. c.1616)
6 May – Catherine Trianon, fortune teller and accused poisoner in the famous Poison Affair (b. 1627)
23 May – Claude Deschamps, actor and playwright (b. c.1600)
28 June – Marie Angélique de Scorailles, noblewoman (b. 1661)
15 September – Louise Marie Anne de Bourbon, illegitimate daughter of Louis XIV of France and his Maîtresse-en-titre, Madame de Montespan  (b. 1674)
23 September – Pierre Simon Jaillot, sculptor (b. 1631)
27 September – Henri de La Ferté-Senneterre, marshal of France and governor of Lorraine (b. 1599)
26 November – Jean Garnier, Jesuit church historian, patristic scholar and moral theologian (b. 1612)
10 December – Gaspard Marsy, sculptor (b. 1624 or 1625)
16 December – François Vavasseur, Jesuit humanist and controversialist (b. 1605)
19 December – Marguerite Joly, accused poisoner in the Poison Affair, confessed under torture to several murders, sentenced to be burned at the stake (b. 1637)
21 December – Lacuzon, Franc-Comtois leader (b. 1607)

Full date missing
Laurent Drelincourt, theologian (b. 1626)
Jacques Gaffarel, scholar and astrologer (b. 1601)
Louis Phélypeaux, seigneur de La Vrillière, politician (b. 1598)
Charles Joseph Tricassin, Capuchin theologian
Pierre Guillaume Néel III, Huguenot (b. 1638)
December – Charles Cotin, abbé, philosopher and poet (b. 1604)
after 1681 – Abraham Ragueneau, painter (b. 1623)

See also

References

1680s in France